Catch the Ghost is a 2019 South Korean television series starring Moon Geun-young and Kim Seon-ho. It aired on tvN from October 21 to December 10, 2019.

Synopsis
Yoo Ryeong became a police investigator in order to find her missing twin sister. She was disappointed because the report of losing her sister was ignored by Ha Ma-ri, the police officer at that time. She thinks her sister has been the victim of serial murder by the Subway Ghost. She does not always follow the rules as she strongly believes in justice. She partners with Go Ji-seok. In the night of her shift, with the help of Kim Woo-hyuk the police officer at metro who is interested in her perseverance, she searched for her sister in the tunnel without her boss knowing. Meanwhile, Go Ji-seok became famous because of his looks and being the best police officer at his class. He gets the promotion to be metro police with his ex-girlfriend Ha Ma-ri, but circumstances forced him to be a police officer at the subway that leads to his breakup with his girlfriend. He strictly followed the rules and doesn't like trouble. Their partnership leads to many problems for him. But due to Yoo Ryeong's sincerity for all the cases, he began to think about his past. Later, Yoo Ryeong wants to separate from her partner because she doesn't want to always depend on him. Ji-seok is devastated but he understands his partner's decision to separate. Inspector Gong, Yoo Ryeong's new partner is frustrated with her antics.  Yoo Ryeong and Ji-seok work together to solve kidnapping incident in the subway. After their collaboration, the two realize they miss each other. Knowing that Inspector Gong can no longer handle Yoo Ryeong, Ji-seok makes a deal to take back Yoo Ryeong as his partner without her knowing. They became partners again, to catch a subway ghost together with their team and search for her sister.

Cast

Main
 Moon Geun-young as Yoo Ryeong
 Kim Seon-ho as Go Ji-seok

Supporting

Police officers
 Jo Jae-yoon as Lee Man-jin
 Ahn Seung-gyun as Kang Soo-ho
 Jung Yoo-jin as Ha Ma-ri
 Ki Do-hoon as Kim Woo-hyeok
 Lee Jun-hyeok as Chief Gong, Chief inspector

Others
 Nam Gi-ae as Han Ae-sim
 Song Ok-sook as Kim Hyeong-ja
 Lee Jae-woo as Kim Hyung-soo
 Park Han-sol as Park Yoo-mi
 Song Sang-eun as Park Mi-hyun
 Oh Hee-joon as Serial pervert
 Park Ho-san as Choi Do-chul (Ep.3-4)
 Han Ji-sang
 Lee Se-hee as "Madonna"
 Lee Hong-nae as Goo Dong-man
 Kim Gun-woo as Kim Hee-Joon
 Baek Seo-yi as Ma Hye-jin (Ep.4–5)

Production
The series was supposed to premiere on August 26, 2019, but was pushed back to October. tvN decided to air The Great Show first, as the series completed its production.

Original soundtrack

Part 1

Part 2

Part 3

Part 4

Part 5

Part 6

Viewership

Notes

References

External links
  
 
 

TVN (South Korean TV channel) television dramas
2019 South Korean television series debuts
2019 South Korean television series endings
Korean-language television shows
South Korean crime television series
Television series by Studio Dragon
Television series by Logos Film